Stian Skjerahaug (born 8 March 1992) is a Norwegian male artistic gymnast, representing his nation in international competitions. He participated at the 2015 European Games in Baku, Azerbaijan, and qualified for the 2016 Summer Olympics.

References

External links 

1992 births
Living people
Norwegian male artistic gymnasts
Sportspeople from Stavanger
Gymnasts at the 2015 European Games
European Games competitors for Norway
Gymnasts at the 2016 Summer Olympics
Olympic gymnasts of Norway
21st-century Norwegian people